Cantonments is an affluent suburb of the Ghanaian city Accra, in the La Dade Kotopon Municipal District, a district in the Greater Accra Region of Ghana.

Overview 
The Cantonments area was intended to become a military quarters under the British Colonial government, in the Gold Coast, now Ghana.

However, it was upgraded to become a modern planned residential settlement. Most of the homes in the area have three to four bedrooms and are often occupied by the wealthy, academics or government officials.

Many diplomatic missions in the country are in the Cantonments area including the U.S. Embassy.

Healthcare
The Cantonments Hospital, Police Hospital and the Health care center & Clinic of Contonments are the healthcare institutions that are located in Cantonments.

Schools 

The following schools are in Cantonments, Accra.

 New Horizon Special School
 National Film and Television Institute (NAFTI)
 Ghana International School
 St. Thomas Aquinas Senior High School
 Morning Star School
 Christ the King International School

References 

Accra
Populated places in the Greater Accra Region